Vernon/Wildlife Water Aerodrome  is located  southwest of Vernon, British Columbia, Canada.

See also
 List of airports in the Okanagan

References

Seaplane bases in British Columbia
Vernon, British Columbia
Airports in the Okanagan
Registered aerodromes in British Columbia